is a railway station on the Odakyu Odawara Line in Setagaya, Tokyo, Japan, operated by the private railway operator Odakyu Electric Railway. The station is named after the nearby Seijo University.

Lines
Seijogakuen-mae Station is served by the Odakyu Odawara Line, and lies 11.6 km from Shinjuku Station.

Layout
The station has two island platforms serving four tracks. They are in the basement level.

Platforms
(Local)
(Semi-Express, Express, Tama Express, Rapid Express, Romance Car "Metro Sagami", Romance Car "Metro Homeway", Romance Car "Bay Resort")
(Semi-Express, Express, Tama Express, Rapid Express, Romance Car "Metro Sagami", Romance Car "Metro Homeway", Romance Car "Bay Resort")

The entrances (North, South and West gates), ticket machines, ticket gates and the station office are on the ground level.

The commercial facilities (Seijo Corty) also start on ground level. Level one and two consist of a supermarket and various shops, level three of community services such as a nursery, cookery and language schools and a gym, and restaurants and an outdoor balcony on level four.

History
Seijogakuen-mae Station opened on 1 April 1927.

Between 1996 and 2004 it was extensively redeveloped and partially moved underground as part of the Odakyu Line's track doubling project.

September 2006 saw the opening of Seijo Corty, a four-storey commercial building.

Station numbering was introduced in January 2014 with Seijogakuen-mae being assigned station number OH14.

Surrounding area
A neighbourhood shopping district surrounds the station, especially outside the North Exit.  The film production studios and sound stages of Toho Corporation are located alongside the Senkawa, a tributary of the Tama River that flows South from main station area.

The Sophia Soshigaya International House|, a large residential facility for foreign students, is about 15 minutes walk north of the station.

See also

 List of railway stations in Japan

References

Railway stations in Tokyo
Odakyu Odawara Line
Stations of Odakyu Electric Railway
Railway stations in Japan opened in 1927